German submarine U-85 was a Type VIIB U-boat of Nazi Germany's Kriegsmarine during World War II.

She was laid down at the Flender Werke in Lübeck on 18 December 1939 as yard number 281. Launched on 10 April 1941, she was commissioned  on 7 June and assigned to the 3rd U-boat Flotilla under the command of Oberleutnant zur See Eberhard Greger.

U-85 conducted four war patrols with the flotilla, and sank three ships, totalling . She was sunk in April 1942 by the US destroyer Roper.

Design
German Type VIIB submarines were preceded by the shorter Type VIIA submarines. U-85 had a displacement of  when at the surface and  while submerged. She had two shafts and two  propellers.

U-85 was fitted with five  torpedo tubes (four fitted at the bow and one at the stern), fourteen torpedoes, one  SK C/35 naval gun, 220 rounds, and one  anti-aircraft gun The boat had a complement of between forty-four and sixty.

Service history

First patrol
U-85 departed Trondheim in Norway on 28 August 1941 for her first patrol. She sank the Thistleglen on 10 September northeast of Cape Farewell (Greenland).

She docked at St. Nazaire on the French Atlantic coast on 18 September.

Second patrol
U-85s second patrol started and finished in Lorient, but was unremarkable.

Third patrol
Nine crew members were lost.

Fourth patrol and loss
Having left St. Nazaire on 21 March 1942, U-85 sank the Norwegian freighter Christen Knudsen off the coast of New Jersey on 10 April.

Wolfpacks
U-85 took part in four wolfpacks, namely:
 Markgraf (1 – 11 September 1941)
 Schlagetot (20 October – 1 November 1941)
 Raubritter (1 – 17 November 1941)
 Störtebecker (17 – 22 November 1941)

Sinking
Roper illuminated the U-boat with its searchlight and observed men on deck near the gun whose firing arc had just been cleared by the course change. Roper raked U-85 with machine gun fire and scored a hit with a 3"/50 caliber gun. Roper then dropped a pattern of 11 depth charges where U-85 had disappeared beneath the surface.

Numerous men were observed in the water, but no rescue attempt was made until daylight. By then, there were no survivors among the 29 bodies floating in life jackets. Some of the bodies were wearing civilian clothes, carrying wallets with United States currency and identification cards. The bodies were fingerprinted, photographed and buried in a night-time military ceremony at the Hampton National Cemetery. More recent investigation by sport divers has raised questions about Navy reports on the wreck.

U-85 was the first U-boat loss of "Operation Drumbeat" (Paukenschlag), the offensive off the eastern seaboard of the United States in 1942.

For their actions in sinking U-85, Destroyer Division 54 commander, Commander Stanley C. Norton and the Ropers captain, Lieutenant commander Hamilton W. Howe, were each awarded the Navy Cross.

Wreck

The hatch of U-85 is on display in the Graveyard of the Atlantic Museum; the submarine herself still serves as an attraction for divers. The Labrador current influences the site and visibility can be low. The majority of the debris lies within a  radius of the wreck. The wreck site was listed on the National Register of Historic Places in 2015.

The Enigma machine was recovered from the wreck by private divers (Jim Bunch, Roger & Rich Hunting) and in 2003 the German government agreed to allow the machine to be displayed at the Graveyard of the Atlantic Museum, in Hatteras, North Carolina.

Summary of raiding history

References

Bibliography

 

 
Hickam, Homer "Torpedo Junction" Naval Institute Press

External links
U-85 Memorial Page with Crew members' birth dates and places
Uboat Archive – U-85

German Type VIIB submarines
U-boats commissioned in 1941
U-boats sunk in 1942
World War II submarines of Germany
1941 ships
Shipwrecks of the Carolina coast
Ships built in Lübeck
U-boats sunk by depth charges
U-boats sunk by US warships
Ships lost with all hands
Maritime incidents in April 1942
National Register of Historic Places in Dare County, North Carolina
Shipwrecks on the National Register of Historic Places in North Carolina
World War II on the National Register of Historic Places